Lyon is an underground light rail station on the Confederation Line of the O-Train in Ottawa located in the western portion of Ottawa's downtown, specifically at Lyon Street and Queen Street, the latter being the street the line runs under within Ottawa's downtown core.

Location

This O-Train station opened on September 14, 2019. It is located at the Lyon Street North and Queen Street intersection, between Bay Street and Kent Street, which formerly served as Transitway bus stops on Albert Street and Slater Street. This stop is projected to have high usage, with access to Sparks Street, the Supreme Court, and the National Archives of Canada.

Layout
The station is an underground side platform station; the platforms are located 17.5 metres underground. A concourse above platform level has ticket barriers on either end, giving access to the Lyon Street (east) and Place de Ville (west) accesses. 

An entrance is integrated into the Place de Ville complex, giving indoor access to a mid-rise office building, three office towers and two major hotels.

The station features two artworks: With Words as their Actions by PLANT Architect, led by Lisa Rapoport, a metal sculpture at concourse level, and This Image Relies on Positive Thinking by Geoff McFetridge, a series of murals of human figures located in the accesses.

History
From July 16 to September 14, 2017, the underground light and music show Kontinuum was held in the not-yet-opened station as part of the Canada 150 celebrations.

Service

The following routes serve Lyon station as of October 6 2019:

References 

Confederation Line stations
Railway stations located underground in Canada
Railway stations in Canada opened in 2019
2019 establishments in Ontario